Wellingborough Town F.C. is a football club based in Wellingborough, Northamptonshire, England. They play in the United Counties Premier Division.

History
The club, Wellingborough Town 2004, was formed in 2004 after the previous club bearing the name had folded.

The club with the same name, was originally formed in 1867. It is claimed that this made it not only the oldest club in Northamptonshire, but also the sixth-oldest in the country. However, since folding, this is no longer the case.  The club played originally under the part-handling code, until becoming a genuine soccer club in 1869, playing at Broad Green, wearing an old gold and black strip. In 1879 Wellingborough Town became the first club to play under floodlights, when they entertained Bedford at the Bassett's Close ground, using lights powered by generators either end of the pitch.

The club joined Division One of the Southern League in 1901–02, moving to their current ground at the Dog & Duck in London Road. In 1905 the club changed name to Wellingborough Redwell but resigned at the end of the season after finishing bottom of Division One, continuing to be called Wellingborough Redwell until reverting to Wellingborough Town in 1919.

Wellingborough joined the Metropolitan League in 1968–69, finishing seventh. They won the title the following season and joined the West Midlands (Regional) League Premier Division, finishing third. In 1971–72, they joined the Southern League Division One North. A reorganisation of the league saw it split into Southern and Midland Divisions, with Wellingborough playing in the Midland Division. However, they struggled, until in 1988–89 they were relegated to
the United Counties League.

The club struggled for thirteen seasons in the UCL, narrowly avoiding relegation from the Premier Division in a number of seasons. However, they could hold out no longer than 2001–02 when the club folded and they resigned from the League.

From the 2019–20 season, Jake Stone took over as First Team Manager after replacing Gary Petts after leaving Cogenhoe United FC. On 2 November, Wellingborough Town reached the furthest in their history in The FA Vase when they beat Dudley Town FC 1--0 in the Second Round. They are due to play away at Wroxham FC in the Third Round on 30 November 2019.

Rebirth
Wellingborough had been without a senior football team for two years when three friends got together to set about re-establishing a football club. Together they assembled a group of twenty-four people who worked to get a new club up and running. Included among the number was World Champion snooker player Peter Ebdon, a local man. The Dog & Duck ground had substantially survived, despite becoming the site of a Travelodge motel. Laurie Owen played a huge part in reforming the club and still plays an active part on the club's committee today.

The Doughboys spent their comeback campaign in the Northamptonshire Senior Youth League. Their application for re-admission to the UCL was approved by the FA. The club finished runners-up in Division One for the loss of just one game in 2005–06 and were promoted back to the Premier Division. Improvements to the ground have seen it graded as suitable for Southern League football.

Under the leadership of chairman Martin Goode, the club ended the 2007/08 season in 10th position, having been on the fringes of promotion throughout the season until a poor run of defeats saw them fall away. Goode resigned in May 2008 with local businessman David Clingo taking over the role. Manager Jason Burnham left in October 2008 to be replaced by Joe Smyth. Clingo, however, stepped down in November 2008 with former Doughboy Manager and Chairman Martin Potton taking over the helm with the club in extreme danger of going out of business due to the lack of sponsorship from local businesses. Also departing the club at the time was Director of Football Steve Whitney, the Reserve Team Manager Simon Anderson and a number of players meaning that new recruits Joe Smyth and his assistant Kevin Fox had to recruit new players for both teams.

In December 2008 the club signed former Premier League striker and Jamaica international Trevor Benjamin arguably one of the most experienced and famous players who has played for the club.

Smyth and his management team kept the club in the Premier Division of the UCL and played a big part in stabilising the club during a rocky financial period in early 2009 before stepping down for personal reasons in May 2009.  The club then appointed former Northampton Town player Rob Gould as first team manager and assistant Nick Verity. Verity left due to personal reasons at the start of the 2012–13 season.

After a disappointing start to the 2012–13 season Rob Gould resigned as manager on 10 September 2012 and was replaced by former Woodford United boss, Phil Mason.

When Mason was forced to stand down due to person reasons he was replaced by Craig Adams. The club had endured a poor start to the 12/13 season but a superb unbeaten run in the New Year saw them ensure survival. A winner from Todd Sawko in the 2–1 home win against Spalding on 25 April made it mathematically certain and the team left the field to the tune of "The Great Escape" booming over the tannoy.

The 2013/14 season saw the return of former goalscoring hero Jason Turner, who left the club for spells with King's Lynn and Holbeach. He scored prolifically once again as the club enjoyed a much better campaign and posted an attendance of 850 for the Boxing Day clash with AFC Rushden and Diamonds. Manager Craig Adams left for Bedford Town towards the end of the season and was replaced by Ben Watts. With several players having departed during the summer (including Turner to Diamonds) Watts had a difficult job in rebuilding the team and left the club after suffering 4 defeats from the opening 4 games. He was replaced by the joint pairing of Steve Herring and Joe Smyth, assisted by Steve's brother Mark.

On 1 April 2015, it was announced that joint managers Steve Herring and Joe Smyth were to step down at the end of the season due to a reduction on playing budget. It was also decided later that week that Jamie Wright, former assistant manager under Craig Adams, would take the position of first team manager for the 2015/16 season. In September 2015, Wright and his assistant Colin Cooper, both resigned with Craig Adams returning as Interim First Team Manager.

In November 2015, local management team Jon Mitchell and Stuart Goosey were handed the roles of First Team and Assistant Manager as the Doughboys look to the future with local players making up the majority of the squad. The duo's first result was a 3–1 victory away at Rothwell Corinthians. Although the side remained in the bottom two for much of the campaign, a considerable improvement in form in the final months of the season ensured that they avoided finishing in the relegation spots. A noteworthy achievement because the clubhouse had been destroyed by fire before Christmas and match-day income was reduced drastically until it had been rebuilt.

In the summer of 2016, Chairman Martin Potton stood down and was replaced by Mark Darnell and Darren Wingrove. The club have held on to many players and brought in some new signings, ensuring that hopes are higher for the coming season.

On 21 July 2016, the club released a joint-statement with AFC Rushden and Diamonds, announcing that Dog and Duck landlord Alper Ozdgan had invoked a clause in their lease agreement, forcing them to leave the ground by 31 May 2017. Diamonds confirmed that they would be seeking an alternative ground share, whereas Wellingborough stated that they felt certain that eviction would ultimately bring an end to the club's 149-year existence. However the club were allowed to remain at the ground, this ending the uncertainty.

Staff Positions
  Manager: Jake Stone
 Assistant manager: Jake Cayton
 Reserve Team Managers: Stefan Emary and Chris Smith
 U18 Manager: Sam O`Sullivan Barker

Notable former players
Phil Neal the former Liverpool and England player . Neal started his career at the club before moving to Northampton Town and on to Liverpool.
Vic Watson, who left the club to join Premier League side West Ham United for just £50. Watson went on to become West Ham's all-time record goalscorer, with 326 goals in 15 years at Upton Park.
Trevor Benjamin, who had previously played for several Football League clubs, most notably Leicester City.
Septimus Atterbury, who is best remembered for thirty years of service that he gave to Plymouth Argyle as a player and then a coach.

Nickname
Wellingborough Town's traditional nickname is "The Doughboys", which is thought to derive from the local speciality "’ock ‘n’ dough". A hock of bacon is an economy cut taken from the front of the leg of the beast. It is cooked slowly in the oven, typically with onions and carrots in a pastry case. There is a notable local public house called the Ock ‘n’ Dough.

Reserve Team

The original reserve team was disbanded after it was agreed that the first team would share the Dog & Duck ground with AFC Rushden & Diamonds. When the ground share agreement was ended, and Rushden moved on to Hayden Road - Wellingborough Town re-launched their Reserve Team for the 2018/19 season managed by Simon Bishop. Bishop gave a number of the club’s under 18 squad their first taste of adult football and finished the season in a creditable 11th place. Lee Goldsborough finished as top goal scorer with 15 goals from 31 appearances. 

When Simon Bishop departed for Rushden & Higham United taking his whole squad with him - Chris Smith was appointed Reserve Manager during the summer of 2019/20. The new squad finished in a then record high position of 7th in the UCL Reserve Division.  

The 2020/21 season was abandoned due to covid.

Wellingborough Town Youth Section

Wellingborough Town Football Club is a Charter Standard Development club and have a successful junior setup.  Wellingborough Town Youth Section has been running mini soccer, boys and girls football teams since 2004. The purpose of Wellingborough Town Youth Section is for boys and girls to have fun playing football, develop their football skills and progress into senior football within the Wellingborough Town Under 18, Reserve and First Teams.

The Wellingborough Town Under 15 team, formerly known as Wellingboro Town Lions, are one of the most successful teams ever in Northamptonshire. They have won a selection of trophies including 2weetabix league trophies, 2 league cups and a 2 county cups and won the John Henry league. All in 4 years. And in 2012 the Treble. They currently play in the Northampton Youth league.
For the 22/23 season the club have appointed Sam O`Sullivan Barker as the Under 18s Manager

Former players
1. Players that have played/managed in the Football League or any foreign equivalent to this level (i.e. fully professional league).
2. Players with full international caps.
3. Players that hold a club record or have captained the club.
 Philip Allen
 Billy Brawn
 Ralph Brett
 Iori Jenkins
 Vic Watson
 Darren Collins
 Trevor Benjamin

Gallery

WTFC TV

Wellingborough Town FC had their own internet television station from February 2010 and were one of the first Non-League clubs in the country to do so.

WTFCTV also produced two DVDs which were sold in the club shop,

References

External links
Wellingborough Town official website
Wellingborough Town Youth Section (Children's Football from ages 6 – 17)
Wellingborough Town at Football Club History Database
The Eagle Bitter United Counties League official website
United Counties League at FA Full Time online
United Counties League at football.mitoo

Football clubs in England
Football clubs in Northamptonshire
Wellingborough
United Counties League
Southern Football League clubs
Metropolitan League
1867 establishments in England
2002 disestablishments in England
2004 establishments in England
Association football clubs established in 1867
Association football clubs established in 2004
Association football clubs disestablished in 2002